Man Eating Bugs: The Art and Science of Eating Insects is a non-fiction book by Peter Menzel and  Faith D'Alusio.

Book summary
The authors traveled to 13 countries to taste insects. The book talks about eating insects and how to harvest them. The animals in the book include insects like jumil stinkbugs, witchetty grub, and silkworms, but also arachnids (not insects) like Theraphosa blondi (a bird-eating tarantula). Faith recommends that people who are new to insect eating start with insects that crisp up well when roasted and avoiding things like worms, which are too chewy, or cicadas, which are too fleshy and tough.

Reception
The book was reviewed favorably by Whole Earth, New Scientist, and Salt Lake Tribune.

See also
Entomophagy
The Eat-A-Bug Cookbook

References

External links
The Independent
Book review - Man Eating Bugs

1998 non-fiction books
Books about food and drink
Insects as food